The 1979 New Orleans Saints season was the team's thirteenth season in the National Football League. The Saints finished the season at 8–8, the franchise's first non-losing season. After starting 0–3, New Orleans won seven of its next 10 and was tied for first place with the Los Angeles Rams in the NFC West with three weeks to play, but the season unraveled in a Monday Night Football contest at home vs. the Oakland Raiders, when the Saints squandered a 35–14 lead and lost, 42–35. The Raiders returned to the Superdome a little over a year later and won Super Bowl XV.

The Saints were eliminated from playoff contention in Week 15 when they were blown out 35–0 at home by the San Diego Chargers, but defeated the NFC West champion Los Angeles Rams in the regular season finale in what was the Rams' last game in the Los Angeles Memorial Coliseum until 2016. While the Rams went on to represent the NFC in Super Bowl XIV, the Saints ended their season with a record of 8-8, the first time in the history of the franchise that the team finished with a non-losing record. Not counting the 1976 expansion Seattle Seahawks, New Orleans was one of three franchises which failed to make the playoffs in the 1970s, joined by the Giants and the Jets (the other 1976 expansion team, the Tampa Bay Buccaneers, won the NFC Central Division in 1979).

Following the season, running back Chuck Muncie was named Most Valuable Player of the ensuing Pro Bowl.

Offseason

NFL draft

Personnel

Staff

Roster

Regular season

Schedule 

Note: Division opponents in bold text

Standings

Season summary

Week 14

Awards and records 
 Chuck Muncie, Pro Bowl Most Valuable Player

References 

 Saints on Pro Football Reference
 Saints on jt-sw.com

New Orleans Saints
New Orleans Saints seasons
New Orleans